Omphalomargarites sagamiensis is a species of sea snail, a marine gastropod mollusk in the family Trochidae, the top snails (not assigned to a subfamily).

References

External links
 To World Register of Marine Species

sagamiensis
Gastropods described in 1971